Oskar Saville is the former lead singer of Chicago-based Rubygrass, and is also a solo artist. She served as lead vocalist for 10,000 Maniacs from 2002 to 2007, and is now a "transformational energy coach" and psychic. She believes, "You were born with two things: belly button and your awesomeness."

Discography
Rubygrass
Fireflies (1998)

Solo
A Girl Named Oskar (2003)

10,000 Maniacs
Live Twenty-Five (2006)
Extended Versions (condensed version of Live Twenty-Five) (2009)

References

External links

10,000 Maniacs – Official Website

10,000 Maniacs members
American women rock singers
Living people
American folk rock musicians
Place of birth missing (living people)
Year of birth missing (living people)